Nike often refers to:
 Nike (mythology), a Greek goddess who personifies victory
 Nike, Inc., a major American producer of athletic shoes, apparel, and sports equipment
Nike may also refer to:

People
 Nike (name), a surname and feminine given name

Nike, daughter of Shahrbaraz

Arts, entertainment, and media
 Nike Award, a Polish language literature prize
Nike of Samothrace, an ancient statue of the goddess Nike
Nike of Callimachus, an ancient statue of the goddess Nike
 "Nikes" (song), by Frank Ocean from the album Blonde (2016)

Military
 Project Nike, a US Army missile project
 MIM-3 Nike Ajax, a solid fuel–propelled surface-to-air missile
 MIM-14 Nike-Hercules, a solid fuel–propelled surface-to-air missile
 Nike (rocket stage)
 Various US sounding rockets named after the upper stage used, including:
 Nike Apache
 Nike-Asp
 Nike-Cajun
 Nike-Deacon
 Nike Hawk
 Nike Hydac
 Nike Iroquois
 Nike Javelin
 Nike Malemute
 Nike Nike
 Nike Orion
 Nike Recruit
 Nike T40 T55
 Nike Tomahawk
 Nike Viper
 Operation Nike an airlift operation carried out by the Hellenic Air Force in Cyprus in July 1974

Other uses
 Nike (horse), an 18th-century British Thoroughbred racehorse
 Nike (Thrace), a town of ancient Thrace
 307 Nike, a large asteroid in the main belt

See also
Niki (disambiguation)